Nairobi is the capital and largest city of Kenya.

Nairobi may also refer to:

Geography and government 

 Africa/Nairobi, a time zone identifier
 Nairobi City Council, former local authority governing the city of Nairobi
 Mayor of Nairobi, non-executive head of Nairobi City Council
 Nairobi City County, one of the 47 counties of Kenya
 Nairobi local elections, 2013, held in Nairobi County
 Nairobi Dam, an embankment dam on the Nairobi River
 Nairobi National Park, in Kenya
 Nairobi Province, former name of Nairobi County
 Nairobi River, which flows through Nairobi

International agreements 

 Nairobi Agreement, 1985, a peace deal between the Ugandan government and the National Resistance Army (NRA)
 Nairobi Agreement, 1999, signed by the Presidents of Sudan and Uganda, in relation to resolving the northern Uganda conflict
 Nairobi Convention, a regional framework agreement of 1985 for marine environmental management

Events 

 Nairobi airport fire, at Jomo Kenyatta International Airport 2013
 2013 Nairobi bus attack, a grenade attack
 2014 Nairobi bus bombings, attacks on two buses
 2011 Nairobi pipeline fire, caused by an explosion secondary to a fuel spill
 Nairobi police station bombing, 2014

Buildings and organizations 

 Nairobi Arboretum, located in Nairobi
 Nairobi Business Park, the first business park in East Africa
 Nairobi Hospital, in Nairobi
 Nairobi Java House, a chain of coffee houses based in Nairobi
 National Museums of Kenya#Nairobi National Museum
 Nairobi Securities Exchange, a voluntary association of stockbrokers based in Nairobi
 Companies traded on the Nairobi Securities Exchange
 Nairobi Women's Hospital, in Nairobi
 Roman Catholic Archdiocese of Nairobi, the Metropolitan See for the Ecclesiastical province of Nairobi in Kenya, and the Primatial see for Kenya
 St. Mary's School, Nairobi, a private school owned by the Archdiocese

Education 

 German School Nairobi, an international school located in Nairobi
 Nairobi Academy, a preparatory and secondary school in Nairobi
 Nairobi Community Media House, organization based in Nairobi which trains young people in filmmaking and editing
 Nairobi Japanese School, in Nairobi
 Nairobi School, a national secondary school in Nairobi
 University of Nairobi (AKA UoN), a collegiate research university based in Nairobi
 Student Organization of Nairobi University
 West Nairobi School (AKA WNS), a Christian international school in Nairobi

Transport 

 Mombasa-Nairobi Standard Gauge Railway, under construction
 Nairobi Airport (disambiguation), either (1) Jomo Kenyatta International Airport, the major airport serving Nairobi, or (2) Wilson Airport, a smaller second airport
 Nairobi airport rail link, intended to connect Jomo Kenyatta International Airport and central Nairobi
 Nairobi Bypasses, roads under construction in and near Nairobi
 Nairobi rail service, a network of diesel trains serving Nairobi and its suburbs
 Nairobi International Airport, a colloquial name for Jomo Kenyatta International Airport
 Nairobi Railway Museum, located in Nairobi
 Nairobi Railway Station, located in Nairobi

Sport 

 Nairobi City Stadium, a multi-purpose stadium in Nairobi
 Nairobi City Stars, an association football club based in Nairobi
 Nairobi Club Ground, a multi-use sports venue in Nairobi, the oldest cricket ground in Kenya
 Nairobi derby, an association football match between the two Nairobi teams A.F.C. Leopards and Gor Mahia
 Nairobi Marathon, an annual road running competition over the marathon distance held in October in Nairobi
 Nairobi Province Cricket Association, an affiliate of Cricket Kenya, responsible for cricketing activities in Nairobi
 Nairobi Stima F.C., an association football club based in Nairobi

Arts and entertainment 

 Black Star Nairobi, a 2013 Kenyan crime fiction novel by Mukoma wa Ngugi
 CRI Nairobi 91.9 FM, a radio station in Nairobi
 "Nairobi", a 1958 UK single by Tommy Steele
 Nairobi Diaries, a Kenyan reality television series that premiered in 2015 
 Nairobi Half Life, a 2012 Kenyan drama film
 The Nairobi Trio, a skit performed several times on television by Ernie Kovacs
 Nairobi (Money Heist), a fictional character in the series Money Heist

Biology 

 Nairobi fly, two species of beetle, Paederus eximius and Paederus sabaeus
 Nairobi grass rat (Arvicanthis nairobae), a species of rodent in the family Muridae, found in Kenya, Tanzania, and possibly Ethiopia

See also 
 History of Nairobi
 List of companies and organizations based in Nairobi
 List of tallest buildings in Nairobi
 Timeline of Nairobi
 Water supply and sanitation in Nairobi